John Dodd was a Scottish merchant who helped promote Taiwan tea to the west in the late 19th century. In 1860, he arrived at Taiwan to do some research for the first time. In 1865, John Dodd established the Dodd & Co in Qing-era Taiwan.

References

Bibliography

English businesspeople
Year of birth missing
Year of death missing